Peter Craven (born 1949 or 1950) is an Australian literary critic and cultural studies writer.

Life and career
While enrolled for a Master of Arts at the University of Melbourne, Craven met Michael Heyward with whom he founded Scripsi, a literary magazine which was published from 1981 to 1994. Craven has written for The Age, The Australian and the Australian Literary Review. His work has also appeared in Oxford Guide to Contemporary Writing, the Times Literary Supplement and London Review of Books.

Craven has been described as both a "literary hack" and "one of the most prolific, erudite and opinionated voices in Australian literary circles". In 2004 he was awarded the Pascall Prize for Australian Critic of the Year.

The legal academic Greg Craven is his younger brother.

Bibliography

Essays, reporting and other contributions

References

External links
List of contributions, The Australian

Living people
Australian literary critics
Quadrant (magazine) people
Quarterly Essay people
Year of birth missing (living people)
University of Melbourne alumni
The Australian journalists